Rupert Sanderson (born in 1966) is a British shoe designer.

Early life and education
Sanderson was born in Penang, Malaysia ans he attendeded King's Ely. Upon graduation from Royal Holloway and Bedford New College, London University, Sanderson worked in advertising in London before enrolling on the shoe making course at Cordwainers College in East London.

Career

Sanderson worked in Italy first for Sergio Rossi, and later Bruno Magli.

Rupert Sanderson produced his first shoe collection in 2001. In 2006 Sanderson bought a controlling interest in the shoe factory in the outskirts of Bologna, Italy, that he had been working with from his first collection.

In 2008 he established Fashion Fringe Shoes  with Colin McDowell's Fashion Fringe organization. That same year he designed shoes for Peter Handke’s The Hour We Knew Nothing of Each Other at the National Theatre. In 2010 he designed shoes for The Royal Opera's Aida (directed by David McVicar) for a cast of over 200.

Achievements and awards
  2008: British Fashion Council Accessory Designer of the Year
  2009: Elle Style Awards Accessory Designer of the Year

Collaborations
 2008 – Louise Goldin (SS09)
 2009 – Karl Lagerfeld (AW09)
 2010 – Karl Lagerfeld (SS10 and AW10)
 2010 - The Royal Opera's Aida - Giuseppe Verdi

References

External links
 

Shoe designers
1966 births
Malaysian socialites
Living people
People from Penang
Malaysian businesspeople
People educated at King's Ely